Harry Hunter Lott (January 13, 1880 – February 5, 1949) was an American rower who competed in the 1904 Summer Olympics, winning the gold medal in the men's eight. He was born in Philadelphia.

Lott rowed for the Vesper Boat Club while he was a medical student at the Jefferson Medical College in Philadelphia. After the Olympics, he earned his medical degree and practiced in Philadelphia as an otolaryngologist specializing in diseases of the ear. He eventually became a professor at his alma mater, which was eventually renamed Thomas Jefferson University.

References

External links
 
 
 

1880 births
1949 deaths
American male rowers
Rowers from Philadelphia
Olympic gold medalists for the United States in rowing
Rowers at the 1904 Summer Olympics
Medalists at the 1904 Summer Olympics
Thomas Jefferson University alumni
American otolaryngologists
20th-century American physicians
20th-century American educators
20th-century surgeons